Denis Wieczorek (born 22 August 1991 in Erfurt) is a German figure skater. He is the 2011 German silver medalist. He placed 14th at the 2009 World Junior Championships and 22nd at the 2008 World Junior Championships. His older sister Kristin Wieczorek competed internationally on the senior level as well.

Programs

Competitive highlights

References

External links

 
 Tracings.net profile

German male single skaters
1991 births
Living people
Sportspeople from Erfurt